The Webb Ellis Cup is the trophy awarded to the winner of the men's Rugby World Cup, the premier competition in men's international rugby union. The Cup is named after William Webb Ellis, who is often credited as being the inventor of rugby football. The trophy is silver gilt and has been presented to the winner of the Rugby World Cup since the first competition in 1987. It has been won three times by New Zealand (1987, 2011 & 2015) and South Africa (1995, 2007 & 2019), twice by Australia (1991 & 1999), and once by England (2003).

The 38-centimeter trophy weighs 4.5 kg, is gilded silver and has two cast scroll handles. One handle bears the head of a satyr, the other the head of a nymph. On the face of the trophy, the words International Rugby Football Board, and below that arch The Webb Ellis Cup are engraved. The Webb Ellis Cup is also referred to (incorrectly) as the "Webb Ellis Trophy" or colloquially as "Bill," a nickname coined by the 1991 Rugby World Cup winners, the Wallabies.

History

There are two official Webb Ellis Cups, which are used interchangeably. One is a 1906 trophy made by Carrington and Co. of London, featuring a Victorian design of a 1740s cup by Paul de Lamerie, while the other is a 1986 replica.

John Kendall-Carpenter, former England forward and the organizer of the first Rugby World Cup, and Bob Weighill, the secretary of the International Rugby Board and also a former England forward, visited Garrard & Co, the crown jeweller in Regent Street, London. Director Richard Jarvis, brought the particular cup down from the vault and showed it to both of them.

It was chosen for use in February 1987. Ronnie Dawson of Ireland, Keith Rowlands of Wales, Bob Stuart and  Dick Littlejohn of New Zealand and the Australians Nick Shehadie and Ross Turnbull approved the choice of the trophy. The trophy is cared for and restored after each tournament by silversmiths Thomas Lyte.

It was soon named "The Webb Ellis Cup". New Zealand became the first nation to win the Webb Ellis Cup when they won the 1987 Rugby World Cup. The Webb Ellis Cup has been held by four nations; New Zealand, Australia, South Africa, and England.

The current holders are South Africa, after they beat England 32–12 in the 2019 Final in Japan. The trophy was on display in Newlands, South Africa until 2009, where it had stayed for two years following their victory in the 2007 tournament. Later, it was returned to the home of World Rugby, Ireland. One cup recently went on tour around the New Zealand provinces along with the Dave Gallaher Trophy, Bledisloe Cup, Hillary Shield, Women's World Cup, World Rugby Sevens Series and the Junior World Cup trophies.

See also

Paul Barrière Trophy

References

External links

 The History of the William Webb Ellis Cup
 Rugby Trophys

Rugby union trophies and awards
Rugby World Cup
Silver-gilt objects
Awards established in 1987